Adam Reefdy bin Muhammad Hasyim (born 8 May 2004) is a Singaporean footballer currently playing as a right-back for Tampines Rovers.

Career statistics

Club

Notes

International statistics

U16 International caps

References

2004 births
Living people
Singaporean footballers
Association football defenders
Singapore Premier League players
Tampines Rovers FC players